Narayanapala (9th-10th century CE) was the seventh emperor of the Pala dynasty of the Eastern regions of the Indian subcontinent, mainly the Bengal and Bihar regions.

He was the son of Vigrahapala I by his wife, the Kalachuri princess Lajjadevi. He was later succeeded by his son Rajyapala.

The Gaya temple inscription dated in his 7th regnal year, the Indian Museum (found in the erstwhile Patna district) stone inscription dated in his 9th regnal year, the Bhagalpur copper-plate grant dated in his 17th regnal year, Bihar votive image inscription dated in his 54th regnal year and the Badal pillar inscription of his minister Bhatta Guravamishra provide information about his reign.

Based on the different interpretations of the various epigraphs and historical records, the different historians estimate Narayanapala's reign as follows:

Narayanapala was defeated by Mihira Bhoja.

See also
List of rulers of Bengal

References

External links
 

Pala kings